When Sweet Moonlight Is Sleeping in the Hills (German: Wenn süß das Mondlicht auf den Hügeln schläft) is a 1969 West German drama film directed by Wolfgang Liebeneiner and starring Werner Hinz, Luitgard Im and Diana Körner. It is based on the 1967 novel At the Height of the Moon by Eric Malpass. It is the sequel to the 1968 film Morning's at Seven.

It was shot at the Spandau Studios in Berlin and on location around Bergisch Gladbach and Solingen in North Rhine-Westphalia. The film's sets were designed by the art director Werner Schlichting. It premiered at the UFA-Palast in Cologne.

Cast
 Archibald Eser as Gaylord
 Irina von Bentheim as Emma
 Werner Hinz as Großvater
 Luitgard Im as May
 Werner Bruhns as Jocelyn
 Diana Körner as Becky
 Rolf Zacher as Peter
 Susanne Uhlen as Jenny
 Jürgen Lentzsch as David
 Ilse Fürstenberg as Frau Miller
 Gerd Lohmeyer as Willy
 Richard Haller as Schilling
 Wolfgang Petry as Bert

References

Bibliography 
 Staub, Alexandra. Conflicted Identities: Housing and the Politics of Cultural Representation. Routledge, 2015.

External links 
 

1969 films
West German films
German drama films
1969 drama films
1960s German-language films
Films directed by Wolfgang Liebeneiner
Constantin Film films
Films shot at Spandau Studios
1960s German films